Sorting nexin-3 is a protein that in humans is encoded by the SNX3 gene.

This gene encodes a member of the sorting nexin family. Members of this family contain a phox (PX) domain, which is a phosphoinositide binding domain, and are involved in intracellular trafficking. This protein does not contain a coiled coil region, like most family members. This protein interacts with phosphatidylinositol-3-phosphate, and is involved in protein trafficking.

References

Further reading